Giulio Scarnicci (5 May 1913 – 13 July 1973) was an Italian screenwriter. He worked on more than thirty films, including the screenplay for the 1960 horror film My Friend, Dr. Jekyll.

Selected filmography
 The Two Sergeants (1951)
 My Friend, Dr. Jekyll (1960)
 His Women (1961)
 L'arbitro (1974)

References

External links 
 

1913 births
1973 deaths
20th-century Italian screenwriters
Italian male screenwriters
Film people from Florence
20th-century Italian male writers